Amaroo is an outback locality split between the Shire of Boulia and the Shire of Diamantina, both in Central Western Queensland, Australia.

Geography 
Amaraoo is a large but largely uninhabited locality in the Channel Country. Rivers like the Georgina River, Burke River, Hamilton River and Sylvester Creek flow through the locality, all of them part of the Lake Eyre basin. These rivers only flow intermittently and, even when they flow, the water usually evaporates before it reaches Lake Eyre. The land is relatively flat so there is no clear single course for these rivers but rather they flow along a series of channels in the same direction (that is, a braided river).

The waterholes that result from the flooding of these rivers sustain both native fauna and support cattle grazing which is the principal land use.

The Boulia Bedourie Road passes through the locality from the north-east (Wills) to the south (Bedourie). The Donohue Highway passes through the locality from the west (Toko) to the north-east (Wills)

The Tropic of Capricorn passes from east to west through the locality.

The entire locality is within the Marian Downs cattle station, which being  also extends into some neighbouring localities. As at 2017, the property is the largest of 14 cattle stations owned by the North Australian Pastoral Company (NAPCO).

History 
The locality takes its name from Lake Amaroo, which in turn derives its name from the Kogai word "Amu" meaning water.

NAPCO purchased Marion Downs in 1934.

Education 
There are no schools in Amaroo. The nearest primary schools are in Boulia and Bedourie. The nearest secondary schools are in Mount Isa, Winton and Longreach and too far for a daily commute. The Spinifex State College in Mount Isa offers boarding facilities. Furthermore, other boarding schools or distance education would also be options for students.

References

External links

Shire of Boulia
Shire of Diamantina
Localities in Queensland